In quantum mechanics, the expectation value is the probabilistic expected value of the result (measurement) of an experiment. It can be thought of as an average of all the possible outcomes of a measurement as weighted by their likelihood, and as such it is not the most probable value of a measurement; indeed the expectation value may have zero probability of occurring (e.g. measurements which can only yield integer values may have a non-integer mean). It is a fundamental concept in all areas of quantum physics.

Operational definition 
Consider an operator . The expectation value is then  in Dirac notation with  a normalized state vector.

Formalism in quantum mechanics 
In quantum theory, an experimental setup is described by the observable  to be measured, and the state  of the system.

Mathematically,  is a self-adjoint operator on a Hilbert space. In the most commonly used case in quantum mechanics,  is a pure state, described by a normalized vector  in the Hilbert space.

If dynamics is considered, either the vector  or the operator  is taken to be time-dependent, depending on whether the Schrödinger picture or Heisenberg picture is used. The evolution of the expectation value does not depend on this choice, however.

If  has a complete set of eigenvectors , with eigenvalues , then can be expressed as

This expression is similar to the arithmetic mean, and illustrates the physical meaning of the mathematical formalism: The eigenvalues  are the possible outcomes of the experiment, and their corresponding coefficient  is the probability that this outcome will occur; it is often called the transition probability.

A particularly simple case arises when  is a projection, and thus has only the eigenvalues 0 and 1. This physically corresponds to a "yes-no" type of experiment. In this case, the expectation value is the probability that the experiment results in "1", and it can be computed as

In quantum theory, it is also possible for an operator to have a non-discrete spectrum, such as the position operator  in quantum mechanics. This operator has a completely continuous spectrum, with eigenvalues and eigenvectors depending on a continuous parameter, . This is formally achieved by projecting the state vector  onto the eigenvalues of the operator, as in the discrete case . It happens that the eigenvectors of the position operator form a complete basis for the vector space of states, and therefore obey a closure relation:

The above may be used to derive the common, integral expression for the expected value, by inserting identities into the vector expression of expected value, then expanding in the position basis:

Where the orthonormality relation of the position basis vectors , reduces the double integral to a single integral.

The expectation value may then be stated, where  is unbounded, as the formula

A similar formula holds for the momentum operator , in systems where it has continuous spectrum.

All the above formulas are valid for pure states  only. Prominently in thermodynamics and quantum optics, also mixed states are of importance; these are described by a positive trace-class operator , the statistical operator or density matrix. The expectation value then can be obtained as

General formulation 
In general, quantum states  are described by positive normalized linear functionals on the set of observables, mathematically often taken to be a C*-algebra. The expectation value of an observable  is then given by

If the algebra of observables acts irreducibly on a Hilbert space, and if  is a normal functional, that is, it is continuous in the ultraweak topology, then it can be written as

with a positive trace-class operator  of trace 1. This gives formula above. In the case of a pure state,  is a projection onto a unit vector . Then , which gives formula above.

 is assumed to be a self-adjoint operator. In the general case, its spectrum will neither be entirely discrete nor entirely continuous. Still, one can write  in a spectral decomposition,

with a projector-valued measure .

In non-relativistic theories of finitely many particles (quantum mechanics, in the strict sense), the states considered are generally normal. However, in other areas of quantum theory, also non-normal states are in use: They appear, for example. in the form of KMS states in quantum statistical mechanics of infinitely extended media, and as charged states in quantum field theory. In these cases, the expectation value is determined only by the more general formula.

Example in configuration space

As an example, consider a quantum mechanical particle in one spatial dimension, in the configuration space representation. Vectors  are represented by functions , called wave functions. The wave functions have a direct interpretation as a probability distribution:

gives the probability of finding the particle in an infinitesimal interval of length  about some point .

As an observable, consider the position operator , which acts on wavefunctions  by

The expectation value, or mean value of measurements, of  performed on a very large number of identical independent systems will be given by

The expectation value only exists if the integral converges, which is not the case for all vectors . This is because the position operator is unbounded, and  has to be chosen from its domain of definition.

In general, the expectation of any observable can be calculated by replacing  with the appropriate operator. For example, to calculate the average momentum, one uses the momentum operator in configuration space, . Explicitly, its expectation value is

Not all operators in general provide a measurable value. An operator that has a pure real expectation value is called an observable and its value can be directly measured in experiment.

See also 
 Rayleigh quotient
 Uncertainty principle
 Virial theorem

Notes

References

Further reading 
The expectation value, in particular as presented in the section "Formalism in quantum mechanics", is covered in most elementary textbooks on quantum mechanics.

For a discussion of conceptual aspects, see:

 

Quantum mechanics

de:Erwartungswert#Quantenmechanischer Erwartungswert